Chris Higgins may refer to:

Chris Higgins (academic) (born 1955), vice-chancellor of Durham University
Chris Higgins (Australian public servant) (1943–1990), senior Australian public servant
Chris Higgins (footballer) (born 1985), Scottish footballer for East Fife, formerly Queen of the South captain 
Chris Higgins (Friday the 13th), character played by Dana Kimmell in the film Friday the 13th Part III
Chris Higgins (ice hockey) (born 1983), American NHL ice hockey player
Chris Higgins (musician) (born 1972), American musician also known as "X-13", former The Offspring touring member
Christopher P. Higgins (1830–1889), American army captain and businessman
Christopher Longuet-Higgins (1923–2004), British theoretical chemist and cognitive scientist